Marvin March (May 8, 1930 – October 31, 2022) was an American set decorator. He has been nominated for five Academy Awards in the category Best Art Direction. March died on October 31, 2022.

Selected filmography 
March has been nominated for five Academy Awards for Best Art Direction:
 The Sunshine Boys (1975)
 The Turning Point (1977)
 California Suite (1978)
 Annie (1982)
 Addams Family Values (1993)

References

External links

1930 births
2022 deaths
American set decorators